The Police ranks of Spanish police officers denote the position of a given officer in the police hierarchy in Spanish police forces.

National

Guardia civil



Customs Surveillance Service





Autonomous Communities







BESCAM



Local



Constable
 Senior Constable
 Sergeant
 Sub-inspector
 Inspector
 Chief Inspector
 Sub-superintendent
 Superintendent



Defunct agencies

Officers

Non-commissioned ranks

Armed Police Corps

General Police Corps

References 

 
Spain
Law enforcement-related lists